Ketu North is one of the constituencies represented in the Parliament of Ghana. It elects one Member of Parliament (MP) by the first past the post system of election. Ketu North is located in the Ketu district of the Volta Region of Ghana.

Boundaries
The constituency is located within the Ketu district of the Volta Region of Ghana. Its northern border is shared with the Republic of Togo. Ketu South constituency is located to the south east. To the south west is the Keta District. The north western neighbour of this constituency is the Akatsi District, which shares the same boundaries with the Avenor-Ave constituency.

Members of Parliament

Elections

See also
List of Ghana Parliament constituencies

References 

Adam Carr's Election Archives
Ghana Home Page

Parliamentary constituencies in the Volta Region